Marshfield, Wisconsin may refer to:

Marshfield, Wisconsin, a city in Wood and Marathon Counties
Marshfield, Fond du Lac County, Wisconsin, a town
Marshfield (town), Wood County, Wisconsin, a town